Bouder Lake is a  lake in Cook County, Minnesota which is tributary to the Poplar River. Bouder is accessible through a navigable channel leading into Crescent Lake. A fisheries survey turned up populations of walleye, muskellunge, smallmouth bass, yellow perch, and white suckers. An aquatic plants survey found the lake to be home to several species of water marigolds, pondweed, bladderwort, water lily, burreed, sedges, and cattails.

On older maps, Bouder Lake has been named as Boulder Lake, Reck Lake, and Rush Lake.

References

Lakes of Cook County, Minnesota
Lakes of Minnesota
Superior National Forest